Worldwide, legislation concerning the effect and validity of electronic signatures, including, but not limited to, cryptographic digital signatures, includes:

Argentina
Ley Nº 25.506 (B.O. 14/12/2001).
Decreto Nº 2628/02 (B.O. 20/12/2002).
Decreto N° 724/06 (B.O. 13/06/06).
Decisión Administrativa N° 927/14 (B.O. 03/11/14).

Bermuda
 Electronic Transactions Act 1999
 Certification Service Providers (Relevant Criteria and Security Guidelines) Regulations 2002

Brazil
Medida provisória 2.200-2 (Portuguese) - Brazilian law states that any digital document is valid for the law if it is certified by ICP-Brasil (the official Brazilian PKI) or if it is certified by other PKI and the concerned parties agree as to the validity of the document.

Canada 
PIPEDA  - Canadian law distinguishes between the generic "electronic signature" and the "secure electronic signature". Federal secure electronic signature regulations make it clear that a secure electronic signature is a digital signature created and verified in a specific manner. Canada's Evidence Act contains evidentiary presumptions about both the integrity and validity of electronic documents with attached secure electronic signatures, and of the authenticity of the secure electronic signatures themselves.

China 
Electronic Signature Law of the People's Republic of China (Chinese/English) - The stated purposes include standardizing the conduct of electronic signatures, confirming the legal validity of electronic signatures and safeguarding the legal interests of parties involved in such matters. This law was revised on 23 April 2019 with immediate effect. The revision involves the deletion of the reference to land conveyancing transactions in Article 3, which provides for types of transaction exempted from the law. Accordingly, land conveyancing agreements can now be executed electronically.

Colombia 
 LEY 527 DE 1999 (agosto 18) por medio de la cual se define y reglamenta el acceso y uso de los mensajes de datos, del comercio electrónico y de las firmas digitales, y se establecen las entidades de certificación y se dictan otras disposiciones.
 DECRETO 2364 DE 2012 (Noviembre 22) por medio del cual se reglamenta el artículo 7° de la Ley 527 de 1999, sobre la firma electrónica y se dictan otras disposiciones.
Decree 333 of 2014, regulates accreditation procedures for Certification Entities, who certify digital signatures.

European Union and the European Economic Area 

 The eIDAS regulation.

In the EU, electronic signatures and related trust services are regulated by the Regulation (EU) N°910/2014 on electronic identification and trust services for electronic transactions in the internal market (eIDAS Regulation). This regulation was adopted by the Council of the European Union on 23 July 2014. It became effective on 1 July and repealed the Electronic Signatures Directive 1999/93/EC. At the same date, any laws of EU member states that were inconsistent with eIDAS were also automatically repealed, replaced or modified. In contract to the aforementioned directive (which allowed the EU member states to interpret it and transpose it to their own law) the eIDAS Regulation is directly effective in all member states.

Before eIDAS 
European Union Directive establishing the framework for electronic signatures:
 Directive 1999/93/EC of the European Parliament and of the Council of 13 December 1999 on a Community framework for electronic signatures. This Directive was repealed on 1 July 2016 and superseded by the eIDAS regulation (see its article 48). 
 Commission Decision 2003/511/EC adopting three CEN Workshop Agreements as technical standards presumed to be in accordance with the Directive
 Implementing laws: Several countries have already implemented the Directive 1999/93/EC.
 Austria
 Signature Law, 2000
 Belgium
 Signature Law, 2001
 Czech Republic
 Act on Electronic Signatures, 227/2000
 Denmark
 Lov om elektroniske signaturer
 England, Scotland and Wales
 Electronic Communications Act, 2000
 The Electronic Signatures Regulations 2002
 Estonia
 Digital signature in Estonia
 Digital Signature Law, 2000 (in Estonian).
 Digital Signatures Act (consolidated text Dec 2003)
 Finland
 Laki vahvasta sähköisestä tunnistamisesta ja sähköisistä allekirjoituksista, 2009 (in Finnish)
 France
 Articles 1363-1368 of the Civil Code (French)
 Germany
 German Signature Law of 2001, changed in 2005
 Greece
 Presidential Decree 150/2001 (in Greek)
 Hungary
 Hungarian Act on Electronic Signatures 2001
 Iceland
 Lög um rafrænar undirskriftir nr. 28/2001
 Ireland, Republic of
 Irish Electronic Commerce Act, 2000
 Italy
 Decreto legislativo 7/3/2005, n. 82 (Codice dell'Amministrazione Digitale)
 Latvia
 Electronic Documents Law, 2002
 Electronic Documents Law, 2002 (in Latvian)
 Lithuania
 Law on electronic signature, 2014 (in Lithuanian)
 Law on electronic signature, 2002 (in English, not relevant in law)
 Luxembourg
 Loi du 14 août 2000 relative au commerce électronique, 2000 (in French)
 Malta
 Maltese Electronic Commerce Act 2001, last amended 2005
Netherlands
article23
 Norway
 Electronic Signature Act, 2001 (in Norwegian).
Poland
act_on_eSignature.pdf
Portugal
portugal_en.pdf
 Romania
 Legea semnăturii electronice, 455/2001 
 Law on the Electronic Signature, 455/2001 (unofficial translation) 
 Slovakia
 Act no.215/2002 on electronic signature (in Slovak)
 Slovenia
 Electronic Business and Electronic Signature Act (in Slovene) .
 Spain
 Ley 6/2020, de 11 de noviembre, reguladora de determinados aspectos de los servicios electrónicos de confianza (in Spanish).  
 Sweden
Qualified Electronic Signatures Act (SFS 2000:832) (in Swedish).
SFS 2000:832 in English translation

Ghana
The Electronic Transactions Act of Ghana, Act 772 of 2008

Guatemala
Ley para el Reconocimiento de las Comunicaciones y Firmas Electrónicas (in Spanish)

India
Information Technology Act, 2000

Indonesia
 Art. 12 Law No.11/2008 on Electronic Informations and Transactions , for general purposes.
 Art. 97B Law No. 13/2022 in regards of Second Amendment of Law No. 12/2011 on Law Formulation (in Indonesian), for government purposes.

Israel
 Electronic Signature Law, 5761–2001

Japan
Law Concerning Electronic Signatures and Certification Services, 2000 (in Japanese)

Korea
Digital Signature Act, Act No. 17354, jun. 9, 2020 (in English) For reference only. No legal or official effect.
Digital Signature Act (in Korean)

Malaysia
 Digital Signature Act (Act 562), 1997 (in Bahasa Malaysia).
 Digital Signature Act (Act 562), 1997 (in English).
 Digital Signature Regulations (P.U.(A) 359), 1998 (in Bahasa Malaysia).
 Digital Signature Regulations (P.U.(A) 359), 1998 (in English).

Maldives
 Electronic Transactions Act 2/2022 (in Dhivehi)

México
 Law of Electronic Signatures (LFEA), 2012   (in Spanish)

Moldova
 Lege cu privire la documentul electronic şi semnătura digitală, 15 July 2004 (in Romanian)
 Law about Electronic Document and Digital Signature (in Russian)

New Zealand
Electronic Transactions Act 2002, sections 22-24
For an overview of the New Zealand law refer:
- The Laws of New Zealand, Electronic Transactions, paras 16-18; or
- Commercial Law, paras 8A.7.1-8A.7.4. (these sources are available on the LexisNexis subscription-only website)

Peru 
Ley Nº 27269. Ley de Firmas y Certificados Digitales (28MAY2000)

Philippines 
Electronic Commerce Act of 2000

Russian Federation 
Federal Law of Russian Federation about Electronic Signature (06.04.2011)

Singapore 
Electronic Transactions Act

South Africa 
Electronic Communications and Transactions Act, 2002 (PDF)

Switzerland
Federal Law on Certification Services Concerning the Electronic Signature, 2003

Ukraine 

 Law On Electronic Digital Signature, 2003  (in Ukrainian), loss of validity on 7 November 2018.
 Law On Electronic Trust Services, 2017 (in Ukrainian), valid since 7 November 2018.

United Nations Commission on International Trade Law
UNCITRAL Model Law on Electronic Signatures (2001), a strong influence in the field.

United States 
Uniform Electronic Transactions Act (UETA)
Electronic Signatures in Global and National Commerce Act (E-SIGN), at 15 U.S.C. 7001 et seq. The law permits the use of electronic signatures in many situations, and preempts many state laws that would otherwise limit the use of electronic signatures.

Case law 
Court decisions discussing the effect and validity of digital signatures or digital signature-related legislation:

In re Piranha, Inc., 2003 WL 21468504 (N.D. Tex) (UETA does not preclude a person from contesting that he executed, adopted, or authorized an electronic signature that is purportedly his).
Cloud Corp. v. Hasbro, 314 F.3d 289 (7th Cir., 2002) EMLF.org (E-SIGN does not apply retroactively to contracts formed before it took effect in 2000. Nevertheless, the statute of frauds was satisfied by the text of E-mail plus an (apparently) written notation.)
Sea-Land Service, Inc. v. Lozen International, 285 F.3d 808 (9th Cir., 2002) Admiraltylawguide.com (Internal corporate E-mail with signature block, forwarded to a third party by another employee, was admissible over hearsay objection as a party-admission, where the statement was apparently within the scope of the author's and forwarder's employment.)

Uruguay
Uruguay laws include both, electronic and digital signatures:
 Concerning passwords or adequate information technology gestures
 Concerning electronic and digital signature and PKI

Turkey
Turkey has an Electronic Signature Law TBMM.gov.tr since 2004. This law is stated in European Union Directive 1999/93/EC. Turkey has a Government Certificate Authority - Kamu SM for all government agents for their internal use and three independent certificate authorities all of which are issuing qualified digital signatures.
 Kamu Sertifikasyon Merkezi (Governmental Certificate Authority) Kamusm.gov.tr 
 E-Güven (owned by Turkish Informatics Foundation) E-guven.com 
 Turktrust (owned by Turkish Military Force Solidarity Foundation) Turktrust.com.tr  
 E-Tugra E-tugra.com

References

In re Piranha, Inc. WL 21468504 (N.D. Tex. 2003). Google Scholar.
Cloud Corp. v. Hasbro, Inc. 314 F. 3d 289 (US: Court of Appeals, 7th Circuit, 2002). Google Scholar.
Legal framework (France: Chambersign France).

Further reading 
 Srivastava Aashish, Electronic Signatures for B2B Contracts: Evidence from Australia (Springer, 2013)
 Lorna Brazell, Electronic Signatures Law and Regulation, (Sweet & Maxwell, 2004)
 J. Buckley, J. Kromer, M. Tank, R. Whitaker, The Law of Electronic Signatures, 2014-2015 Edition (Thomson Reuters, 2014)
 Dennis Campbell, editor, E-Commerce and the Law of Digital Signatures (Oceana Publications, 2005)
 Stephen Mason and Daniel Seng, editors, Electronic Evidence and Electronic Signatures (5th edition, Institute of Advanced Legal Studies for the SAS Humanities Digital Library, School of Advanced Study, University of London, 2021), open source at https://ials.sas.ac.uk/publications/electronic-evidence-and-electronic-signatures
 M. H. M Schellenkens, Electronic Signatures Authentication Technology from a Legal Perspective, (TMC Asser Press, 2004)

Cryptography law
Computer law
Signature